The  is a limited express passenger train service operated by West Japan Railway Company (JR West) mainly between Kyoto Station to Kansai International Airport in Osaka Prefecture, Japan. Dubbed as the Kansai Airport Limited Express (関空特急) by JR West, it is the fastest train service connecting the airport with downtown Osaka and Kyoto, and also travels to and from  via Kyoto during peak hours.

Operations
There are a total of 30 daily return workings per direction (30 to the airport, 30 from the airport), with services operating every half an hour through most of the day. A typical travel time between Kyoto Station and the airport takes 1 hour 20 minutes per way.

Before the discontinuation of services between Maibara and Yasu, two morning rush hour Haruka trains ran from Maibara to the airport, and one morning rush hour trip from Kusatsu. Two evening rush hour Haruka trains also ran from the airport to Maibara.

Station stops
The Haruka primarily operates between Kyoto Station and Kansai Airport Station, with most services stopping only at Shin-Ōsaka Station, Ōsaka Station, and Tennōji Station in Osaka City. Some trains make additional stops during the early morning or evening rush hours (stations in italics in list below).

The train service once traveled over the Umeda Freight Line which was used to bypass Ōsaka Station when it runs from the Tōkaidō Main Line to Osaka Loop Line and vice versa, until the underground tracks and platforms for trains either stopping at and passing the former were opened on 18 March 2023.

Rolling stock

 281 series (since September 1994)
 271 series (since March 2020)

Formations

6-car formations
6-car formations are arranged as shown below, with car 1 at the Maibara/Kyoto end.

All cars are no-smoking.

9-car formations
9-car formations are arranged as shown below, with car 1 at the Kyoto end.

All cars are no-smoking.

Ticketing
The ICOCA card can be used as a fare ticket (for passing the ticket gate) for non-reserved travel, with the limited express ticket purchased from the conductor on board the train. There are no extra charges required for the Haruka service for foreign passengers traveling with a Japan Rail Pass.

A free public Wi-Fi service is provided in the train.

History
The Haruka service was inaugurated on 4 September 1994 using 3-car 281 series EMUs.

6-car 281 series sets were introduced from 2 April 1995, and 9-car (6+3-car) formations were introduced from 14 July 1995.

Non-reserved cars were introduced from 1 December 1998.

The smoking areas were abolished from the start of 18 March 2007 timetable revision.

Haruka services were suspended on 4 September 2018 due to the effects of Typhoon Jebi causing damage to the airport and the Sky Gate Bridge R being damaged by an empty fuel tanker. Services were restored on 8 September 2018, but could only go as far as Hineno Station due to the section leading to the airport being cordoned off for repair works. Through services to the airport were completely restored on 18 September 2018.

From the start of the revised timetable on 14 March 2020, new 271 series trains were introduced on these services, operating coupled with the existing 281 series sets. From the same date, all Haruka services were formed as nine cars, increasing passenger capacity between Kansai International Airport and Kyoto.

All trains currently run in a special "Hello Kitty"-themed wrapping since 29 January 2019.

Haruka services were reduced since September 2020 due to low passenger demand caused by the COVID-19 pandemic in Japan, only operating during morning and evening commuter hours. Daytime Haruka services were partially restored from 1 July 2022, with the remaining services reinstated on 1 November 2022 to coincide with the reopening of Japan's borders.

From the start of the revised timetable on 18 March 2023, all Haruka services began to make stop at Ōsaka Station using the new Umekita underground platforms set aside for these services, facilitating better connectivity between the airport and the city center. In preparation for the opening of the Umekita underground platforms, train services were rerouted from the Umeda Freight Line from 13 February 2023. The new platforms opened for service a month later on 18 March 2023.

References

External links

 Official website (in English)
 Limited Express Haruka 281 series 

 Haruka train service timetable, PDF

Named passenger trains of Japan
Airport rail links in Japan
Rail transport in Osaka Prefecture
West Japan Railway Company
Railway services introduced in 1994
1994 establishments in Japan